Josef Polák is a retired Czechoslovak slalom canoeist who competed in the early 1960s. He won a silver medal in the C-2 team event at the 1961 ICF Canoe Slalom World Championships in Hainsberg.

References

External links 
 Josef POLAK at CanoeSlalom.net

Czechoslovak male canoeists
Possibly living people
Year of birth missing (living people)
Medalists at the ICF Canoe Slalom World Championships